This is a list of initials, acronyms, expressions, euphemisms, jargon, military slang, and sayings in common or formerly common use in the United States Air Force. Many of the words or phrases have varying levels of acceptance among different units or communities, and some also have varying levels of appropriateness (usually dependent on how senior the user is in rank). Many terms also have equivalents among other service branches that are comparable in meaning. Many acronyms and terms have come into common use from voice procedure use over communication channels, translated into the NATO phonetic alphabet, or both.  Acronyms and abbreviations are common in Officer and Enlisted Performance Reports, but can differ between major commands.

0–9 

 1st Lt – First Lieutenant; officer pay grade O-2
 2d Lt – Second Lieutenant; officer pay grade O-1
 3C – Cross Cultural Competence

A

 A1C – Airman First Class; enlisted pay grade E-3, known as Airman Second Class (A2C) from 1952 to 1967
 A2C – Airman Second Class; former enlisted pay grade E-3 from 1952 to 1967, now designated as A1C
 A3C – Airman Third Class; former enlisted pay grade E-2 from 1952 to 1967, now designated as Amn
 AADS – Alaskan Air Defense Sector
 AAFES – Army and Air Force Exchange Service (pronounced "A-Fees")
 AB – Airman Basic; enlisted pay grade E-1
 AB – Air Base
 ABDR – Aircraft Battle Damage Repair
 ABM – Air Battle Manager
 ABU – Airman Battle Uniform
 ABW – Air Base Wing
 ACA – Airspace Control Authority
 ACC – Air Combat Command, also Area Control Center
ACFT – Aircraft
 ACO – Aerospace Control Officer
 ACOT – Advanced Communications Officer Training
 ACS – Air Control Squadron
 ACSC – Air Command and Staff College
 ACW – Air Control Wing 
 ADC – Area Defense Counsel
 ADC – (Obsolete term) Air Defense Command, later Aerospace Defense Command (disestablished MAJCOM)
 ADCON – Administrative Control
 ADP – Airman Development Plan
 ADPE – Automated Data Processing Equipment
 ADR – Airfield Damage Repair
 ADSC – Active Duty Service Commitment
 AEF – Aerospace Expeditionary Force
 AES – Aeromedical Evacuation Squadron
 AETC – Air Education and Training Command
 AETS – Aeromedical Evacuation Training Squadron
 AEW – Air Expeditionary Wing
 AFA – Air Force Academy
 AFA – Air Force Association
 AFAA – Air Force Audit Agency
 AFAM – Air Force Achievement Medal
 AFAMS – Air Force Agency for Modeling and Simulation
 AFB – Air Force Base
 AFC2IC – Air Force Command and Control Integration Center
 AFCA – Air Force Communications Agency
 AFCAA – Air Force Cost Analysis Agency
 AFCAT – Air Force Catalog
 AFCEC – Air Force Civil Engineering Center
 AFCEE – Air Force Center for Engineering and the Environment
 AFCENT – Air Forces Central
 AFCESA – Air Force Civil Engineer Support Agency
 AFCFM – Air Force Career Field Manager
 AFCLC – Air Force Culture and Learning Center
 AFCM – Air Force Commendation Medal
 AFDC – Air Force Doctrine Center
 AFDW – Air Force District of Washington
 AFE – Aircrew Flight Equipment
 AFETS – Air Force Engineering and Technical Services
 AFFMA – Air Force Frequency Management Agency
 AFFSA – Air Force Flight Standards Agency
 AFFSC – Air Force Financial Services Center
 AFGSC – Air Force Global Strike Command
 AFH – Air Force Handbook
 AFHRA – Air Force Historical Research Agency
 AFI – Air Force Instruction; or as a duty status, awaiting further instructions
 AFIA – Air Force Inspection Agency
 AFIAA – Air Force Intelligence Analysis Agency
 AFIS – Air Force Inspection System
 AFISRA – Air Force Intelligence, Surveillance and Reconnaissance Agency
 AFIT – Air Force Institute of Technology
 AFLC – Air Force Logistics Command (disestablished MAJCOM; merged with AFSC in 1992 to form AFMC)
 AFLMA – Air Force Logistics Management Agency
 AFLOA – Air Force Legal Operations Agency
 AFMA – Air Force Manpower Agency
 AFMAN – Air Force Manual
 AFMC – Air Force Materiel Command
 AFMOA – Air Force Medical Operations Agency
 AFMPC – Air Force Military Personnel Center (obsolete), replaced with AFPC
 AFMS – Air Force Medical Service or Air Force Manpower Standards
 AFMSA – Air Force Medical Support Agency
 AFNIC – Air Force Network Integration Center
 AFNOC – Air Force Network Operations Center
 AFNORTH – Air Forces Northern
 AFNSEPO – Air Force National Security Emergency Preparedness Office
 AFNWCA – Air Force Nuclear Weapons and Counterproliferation Agency
 AFOG – Air Force Operations Group
 AFOSI – Air Force Office of Special Investigations
 AFOQT – Air Force Officer Qualifying Test
 AFOTEC – Air Force Operational Test and Evaluation Center
 AFPAA – Air Force Public Affairs Agency
 AFPAM – Air Force Pamphlet
 AFPC – Air Force Personnel Center
 AFPCA – Air Force Pentagon Communications Agency
 AFPD – Air Force Policy Directive
 AFPEO – Air Force Program Executive Office
 AFPET – Air Force Petroleum Agency
 AFPOA – Air Force Personnel Operations Agency
 AFRBA – Air Force Review Boards Agency
 AFRC – Air Force Reserve Command
 AFRCC – Air Force Rescue Coordination Center
 AFRIMS – Air Force Records Information Management System
 AFRL – Air Force Research Lab
 AFROTC – Air Force Reserve Officers Training Corps
 AFRPA – Air Force Real Property Agency
 AFS – Air Force Station
 AFSA – Air Force Sergeants Association
 AFSC – Air Force Sustainment Center The mission of the Air Force Sustainment Center is to Sustain Weapon System Readiness to generate Air power for America. The center provides war-winning expeditionary capabilities to the war fighter through world-class depot maintenance, supply chain management and installation support. 
 AFSC – Air Force Safety Center
 AFSC – Air Force Specialty Code
 AFSC – Air Force Systems Command (disestablished MAJCOM; merged with AFLC in 1992 to form AFMC)
 AFSCF – Air Force Satellite Control Facility
 AFSFC – Air Force Security Forces Center
 AFSO 21 – Air Force Smart Operations for the 21st Century
 AFSOC – Air Force Special Operations Command
 AFSOUTH – Air Forces Southern
 AFSPC – Air Force Space Command
 AFSVA – Air Force Services Agency
 AFT – Alert Fire Team
 AFTO – Air Force Technical Order
 AFVA – Air Force Visual Aids
 AFVEC – Air Force Virtual Education Center
 AFWA – Air Force Weather Agency
 AG (TAG) – Adjutant General, (The)
 AGE – Aerospace Ground Equipment; analogous to Ground Support Equipment (GSE) in USN, USMC and USCG (Naval Aviation) 
 AGE Ranger – An AGE Technician
 AGR – Active Guard and Reserve 
 AGS – Aircraft Generation Squadron
 AGSM – Anti-G Straining Maneuver
 AGOW – Air-Ground Operations Wing
 AIRA – Air Attaché
 AKRAOC – Alaska Region Air Operations Center
 ALCM – Air Launched Cruise Missile
 ALCON – All Concerned (used in message headers for mass emailings)
 ALO – Air Liaison Officer
 ALS – Airman Leadership School
 AMC – Air Mobility Command
 AMJAMS – Automated Military Justice Analysis and Management System
 Amn – Airman; enlisted pay grade E-2 
 AMMO Troop – Munitions Systems Technician AMMO (U.S. Air Force)
 AMMS – Airborne Missile Maintenance Squadron Missile Badge
 AMS – Academy of Military Science
 AMT – Aircraft Metals Technology
 AMW – Air Mobility Wing/Anti-morale Warfare
 AMXS – Aircraft Maintenance Squadron
 ANG – Air National Guard
 ANR – Alaskan NORAD Region
 AO – Authorized Outage
 AOC – Air and Space Operations Center
 AOG – Aircraft On Ground
 AP – Air Police (Obsolete term); now called Security Forces (SF)
 APS – Aerial Port Squadron
 ARI – Alcohol Related Incident
 ARS – (Obsolete term) Air Rescue Squadron; formerly ARRS, now known as a Rescue Squadron (RQS)
 ARRS – (Obsolete term) Aerospace Rescue and Recovery Squadron
 ART – AEF (Air Expeditionary Force) Reporting Tool
 ART – Air Reserve Technician 
 ART – Armed or Alarm or Area Response Team
 ARW – Air Refueling Wing
 AS – Airlift Squadron
 AS – Air Station
 ASAP – As Soon As Possible
 ASBC – Air and Space Basic Course
 ASI – Authorized Service Interruption
 ASOC – Air Support Operations Center  (formerly DASC – Direct Air Support Center)
 ASR – Airport Surveillance Radar
 ATAG – Assistant to the Adjutant General
 ATC – Air traffic control
 ATC – Air Training Command (disestablished MAJCOM; superseded in 1992 by AETC) 
 ATCALS – Air Traffic Control and Landing Systems
 ATO – Air Tasking Order
 ATO – Anti-Terrorism Officer
 ATO – Authority to Operate
 AU – Air University
 AU-ABC – Air University Associate to Baccalaureate Cooperative
 AV – Avionics
 AW – Airlift Wing
 AWACS – Airborne Warning and Control System on the E-3 Sentry aircraft
 AWC – Air War College
 AWOL – Absent Without Leave
 AWP – Awaiting Parts

B

 BAH – Basic Allowance for Housing
 BAS – Basic Allowance for Subsistence
 BASH – Bird/Wildlife Aircraft Strike Hazard
 BAQ – Bachelor Airman Quarters
 BCOT – Basic Communications Officer Training
 BDOC – Base Defense Operations Center
 BDU – Battle Dress Uniform
 BEQ – Bachelor Enlisted Quarters
 BIT – Bystander Intervention Training
 BITC – Base Information Transfer Center
 BITS – Base Information Transfer System
 BFM – Basic Fighter Maneuvers
 BFT – Blue Force Tracking
 BLUF – Bottom Line Up Front
 BMT – Basic Military Training
 BOHICA – Bend Over, Here It Comes Again; used in response to unfavorable orders.
 BONE – Nickname for the B-1 Lancer, as in "B-ONE"
 BOQ – Bachelor Officer Quarters
 BOS – Base Operating Support
 BOT – Basic Officer Training
 Box Nasty – A sandwich & snack meal in a cardboard box handed out for flights
 BPZ – Below Primary Zone; early promotion of an officer ahead of peers to controlled statutory pay grades of O-4, O-5 and/or O-6 
 BRAC – Base Realignment and Closure
 Brig Gen – Brigadier General; officer pay grade O-7
 BRM – Base Records Manager
 BS – Bomb Squadron
 BSA – Basic Surface Attack
 BTZ – Below the zone; USAF early promotion program from E-3 to E-4
 BUFF – Big Ugly Fat Fucker (Nickname for Boeing B-52 Stratofortress)
 BW – Bomb Wing
 BX – Base Exchange (see AAFES)

C

 C-Day – The unnamed day on which a deployment operation begins or is to begin
 C2 – Command and Control
 C4ISR – Command, Control, Communications, Computers, Intelligence, Surveillance, and Reconnaissance
 CA – Combat Arms
 CAF – Combat Air Force
 CAFSC – Control Air Force Specialty Code
 CAI – Computer Aided Instruction
 CAOC – Combined Air and Space Operations Center
 CAMS – Core Automated Maintenance System (database behind IMDS)
 CANX – Cancelled
 CAP – Civil Air Patrol, the civilian USAF Auxiliary
 CAP-USAF – Air Force support, liaison and oversight of Civil Air Patrol
 Capt – Captain; officer pay grade O-3
 CAS – Close Air Support
 CAST – Combat Airman Skills Training
 CAT – Crisis Action Team
 CAT – Camper Alert Team (Security Forces, Missile Field Security)
 CATM – Combat Arms Training and Maintenance
 CBCS – Combat Communications Squadron
 CBMC – Communications Battlespace Management Course
 CBT – Computer Based Training
 CBRNE – Chemical, Biological, Radiological, Nuclear, and High Yield Explosives
 CC – Commander
 CCC – Commanders Chief
 CCS – Commanders Secretary
 CCAF – Community College of the Air Force
 CCE – Executive Officer
 CCF – First Sergeant
 CCT – Combat Control
 CD – Deputy Commander
 CDC – Career Development Course
 CE – Civil Engineering or Civil Engineers
 CEG – Combat Evaluation Group
 CEM – Chief Enlisted Manager
 CES – Civil Engineering Squadron
 CEVG – Combat Evaluation Group
 CFEPT – Career Field Education and Training Plan
 CFP – Communications Focal Point
 CFR – Crash Fire Rescue
 CFT – Cockpit Familiarization Trainer
 CGO – Company Grade Officer (lieutenants and captains)
 CGOC – Company Grade Officers' Council
 Ch – Chaplain
 Charlie Bravo – Cut-back, or being released early from duty
 Charlie Foxtrot – Cluster Fuck
 Chief – Proper term of address for Chief Master Sergeant. Also frequently used by pilots to informally refer to maintenance personnel, specifically "Crew Chiefs."
 CI – Counterintelligence
CI – Compliance Inspection
 CISM – Close In Security Mobile
 Class Six – BX-administered store where beer, wine & liquor is sold at a discounted price with no sales tax
 CJCS – Chairman of the Joint Chiefs of Staff 
 CMO – Civil-Military Operations
 CMO – Chief Medical Officer (term for senior medical officer at each MEPS – Military Entrance Processing Station)
 CMSAF – Chief Master Sergeant of the Air Force; senior active duty enlisted member of the Air Force and a direct advisor to CSAF (holds enlisted pay grade E-9) 
 CMSgt – Chief Master Sergeant; enlisted pay grade E-9
 CNA – Computer Network Attack
 CND – Could Not Duplicate
 CND – Computer Network Defense
 CNO – Computer Network Operations
 CNT – Counter Narco-Terror
 COA – Course of Action
 Col – Colonel; officer pay grade O-6
 COLA – Cost of Living Adjustment
 COMINT – Communications Intelligence
 CONOPS – Concept of Operations
 CONS – Contracting Squadron
 CONUS – Continental United States
 COMAFFOR – Commander, Air Force Forces
 Cop – term for Air Force Security Forces personnel
 COT – Commissioned Officer Training
 CPF – Civilian Personnel Flight
 CPTS – Comptroller Squadron
 Crew Chief – Generally used as an informal slang term for Aerospace Maintenance Personnel, AFSC 2A5. More formally used to refer to an individual in charge of an aircraft maintenance related task requiring multiple people.
 CRC – Control & Reporting Center
 CRO – Combat Rescue Officer; commissioned officer equivalent of an enlisted PJ
 CRO – COMSEC Responsible Officer
 CRS – Corneal Refractive Surgery
 CS – Communications Squadron
 CSAF – Chief of Staff of the Air Force; senior ranking active duty General in USAF unless the CJCS or VCJCS post is held by a USAF General (holds officer pay grade O-10)
 CSAR – Combat Search and Rescue
 CSC – Central Security Control
 CSS – Commander's Support Staff (orderly room)
 CSO – Combat Systems Officer; a commissioned officer aeronautical rating known as Navigator until 1992
 CV – Vice Commander
 CUI – Combined Unit Inspection
 CWO – Chief Warrant Officer; commissioned officer pay grades W-2 through W-5, currently discontinued in USAF

D

 D-Day – The unnamed day on which an operation begins or is to begin
 DACBT – Dissimilar Air Combat Training
 DAFSC – Duty Air Force Specialty Code
 DART – Dumbass Radio Troop
 DAS – Date Arrived Station
 DATT – Defense Attaché
 DBA – Dirtbag Airman (An Airman who does not represent the Air Force Core Values)
 DCO – Defensive Cyber Operations
 DEAD – Destruction of Enemy Air Defenses
 DEERS – Defense Eligibility Enrollment Reporting System
 DEROS – Date Estimated Return from OverSeas
 Dependent – Non-Military family member of a service member, typically a non-military spouse and/or children, entitled to a DD 1173 Military Dependent ID Card  
 DFAC – Dining Facility
 DFAS – Defense Finance and Accounting Service
 Dickbeaters – term referring to one's hands. Often yelled by MTIs in the form of "pin those Dickbeaters to your side!"
 DINSTAAR – Danger Is No Stranger To An AGE Ranger (See AGE)
 Disgruntled Airman - In basic training, when things aren't up to par during dorm inspections, any and all write-ups can be blamed on this fictional spectre
 DMSP – Defense Meteorological Satellite Program
 DNIF – Duties Not Including Flying
 DOE – Date of Enlistment
 Dollar Ride – A pilot's first flight in an airframe
 Doolie – nickname for a first year Air Force Academy cadet
 DOR – Date of Rank
 Double Dip – Term used for certain full-time Air Force Reserve and Air National Guard personnel when in a dual status and receiving income from two sources (e.g., Air Reserve Technician on civilian military leave as a Department of the Air Force civil servant and on concurrent active duty USAF orders)
 DRSN – Defense Red Switch Network
 DRU – Direct Reporting Unit
 DSCS – Defense Satellite Communications System
 DSD – Developmental Special Duty
 DSN – Defense Switched Network
 DSP – Defense Support Program
 DSPD – Defense Support to Public Diplomacy
 DT – Development Team
 DTG – Days To Go
 DTS – Defense Travel System
 DV – Distinguished Visitor; visiting enlisted personnel in pay grade E-9, visiting officer personnel in pay grades O-6 through O-10, or visiting civilian equivalents such as GS-15, SES or politically appointed or elected government officials
 DVQ – Distinguished Visitors Quarters
 DVOQ – Distinguished Visiting Officers Quarters
 DWC – Deputy Wing Chaplain
 DZ – Drop Zone

E

 EAD – Extended Active Duty 
 EADS – Eastern Air Defense Sector
 ECM – Electronic Counter Measures
 ECP – Entry Control Point
 EELV – Evolved Expendable Launch Vehicle
 EET – Exercise Evaluation Team
 EFMP – Exceptional Family Member Program
 EHE - Expected Horizontal Error
 EI – Engineering & Installation
 EIS – Engineering & Installation Squadron
 ELINT – Electronic signals Intelligence
 EGI – Embedded GPS/Inertial Navigation
 Embrace The Suck – Slang used among junior enlisted referencing they have little say in undesirable decisions, effectively advice that one should not worry themselves over things they cannot control
 EMEDS – Expeditionary Medical Support
 EMSEC – Emission Security
 ENJJPT – Euro NATO Joint Jet Pilot Training
 EO – Equal Opportunity
 EOC – Emergency Operations Center
 EOD – Explosive Ordnance Disposal
 EPR – Enlisted Performance Report
 ERCC – Engine Run Crew Change
 E-VAR – Electronic Visitor Access Request
 ERO – Engine Running Onload/Offload
 EW – Electronic Warfare
 EWO – Electronic Warfare Officer

F

 FA – Fitness Assessment
 FAA – Federal Aviation Administration
 FAB – Forward Air Base
 FAC – Forward Air Controller
 FAIP – First Assignment Instructor Pilot
 FAM – Functional Area Manager
 Farts and darts – clouds and darts embroidery found on field grade and general officers' service cap visors
 Fat Albert – Nickname used for the C-5A Galaxy until revoked by USAF as “derogatory”.  Name came from Bill Cosby's recording of “Revenge” in 1968, with the story of “Buck Buck” and Fat Albert shaking the ground as he ran.
 FGO – Field Grade Officer (majors, lieutenant colonels, and colonels)
 FIGMO – Fuck it I Got My Orders
 Fini Flight – A pilot's last flight in the aircraft before he/she leaves a squadron, a wing, or retires from the Air Force 
 FLPP – Foreign Language Profeciency Pay
 FM – Financial Management Comptroller
 FMC – Fully Mission Capable
 FMS – Foreign Military Sales
 FMS – Field Maintenance Squadron
 FNG – Fucking New Guy
 FOA – Field Operating Agency
 FOD – Foreign Object Damage or debris that can cause damage
 FOUO – For Official Use Only
 Four Fan Trash Can – Nickname for the C-130 Hercules
 Four Fans of Freedom – Nickname for the C-130 Hercules
 Fox One - Brevity code for a simulated or actual release of a semi-active radar-guided air-to-air missile, such as the AIM-7 Sparrow.
 Fox Two - Brevity code for a simulated or actual release of an infrared-guided air-to-air missile, such as the AIM-9 Sidewinder.
 Fox Three - Brevity code for a simulated or actual launch of an active radar-guided air-to-air missile, such as the AIM-120 AMRAAM.
 FRED – Fucking Ridiculous Economic Disaster (term for the C-5 Galaxy)
 FS – Fighter Squadron
 FSB – Force Shaping Board
 FSS – Force Support Squadron
 FTAC – First Term Airman's Center
 FTS – Flying Training Squadron
 FTU – Formal Training Unit
 FTW – Flying Training Wing
 FUBAR – Fucked Up Beyond All Recognition
 FW – Fighter Wing
 FW&A – Fraud, Waste and Abuse
 FYSA – For Your Situational Awareness

G

 G-LOC – G-induced Loss of Consciousness
 GAB – Ground Abort; Aircraft flight/sortie that canceled before take-off
 GBS – Global Broadcast Service (pronounced: jibz–IPA: dʒɪbz)
 GC / GNC – Guidance and Control
 GCCS – Global Command and Control System (pronounced: geeks–IPA: giks)
 GCIC – Global Cyberspace Integration Center
 GCS – Ground Control Station
 GDT – Ground Data Terminal
 Gen – General; officer pay grade O-10
 GLCM – Ground Launched Cruise Missile
 GO – General Officer – officers in pay grades O-7, O-8, O-9 and O-10 (analogous to a Flag Officer)
 GOCO – Government Owned, Contractor Operated
 GOGO – Government Owned, Government Operated
 GOV – Government Owned Vehicle
 Gp – Group
 GPC – Government Purchase Card
 GPS – Global Positioning System
 GTC – Government Travel Card
 GV – Giant Voice (RF Trans)
 GuDawg – F-4 Phantom Crew Chief made of Iron (from Tae Gu ROK)
 GWOT – Global War On Terrorism

H

 HAF – Headquarters Air Force
 HALO – High Altitude, Low Opening
 HAHO – High Altitude, High Opening
 Hangar "[#]" – A nonexistent hangar (e.g., if there are 4 hangars, then it would be Hangar 5); heard most often over radios as slang code for latrine/bathroom/Porta John. Example: "Get me to Hangar 5!"
 HARM – High Speed Anti-Radiation Missile
 HARM – Host Aviation Resource Management
 HARRT – Humanitarian Assistance Rapid Response Team
 Hawg – Nickname for the A-10 Thunderbolt II
 HAZCON – Hazardous Condition
 HC – Chaplain Headquarters 
 HIA – Held in Abeyance
 HO – Historian's Office
 HPC – Historic Properties Custodian
 HTS – HARM Targeting System
 HUA – Heard, Understood, Acknowledged
 HUAW – Hurry Up and Wait
 HUD – Head-Up Display
 HUMINT – Human Intelligence

I

 IA – Information Assurance
 IAW – In Accordance With
 ICBM – Intercontinental Ballistic Missile
 ID 10 T Problem – A problem that is created by an "idiot"
 IFE – In-Flight Emergency
 IFF – Identification Friend or Foe
 IFF – Introduction to Fighter Fundamentals
 IFFCC – Integrated Flight and Fire Control Computer
 IFS – Introductory Flight Screening
 IFT – Introductory Flight Training
 IG – Inspector General
 ILS – Instrument landing system
 IMDS – Integrated Maintenance Database System
 IMINT – Imagery Intelligence
 INOP – Inoperative/Inoperable 
 INOSC – Integrated Network Operations and Security Center
 IP – Instructor Pilot
 IPB – Intelligence Preparation of the Battlespace
 IO – Information Operations
 IOC – Initial Operational Capability
 IOIC – Information Operations Integration Course
 IS – Intelligence Squadron
 ISR – Intelligence, Surveillance, and Reconnaissance
 ISRLO – Intelligence, Surveillance, and Reconnaissance Liaison Officer
 ISSM – Information Systems Security Manager
 ISSO – Information Systems Security Officer
 ITT – Information, Tickets, and Travel
 IYAAYAS – If You Ain't Ammo, You Ain't Shit
 IYAAYWOT – If You Ain't Ammo, You're Waitin' On Them

J

 J-STARS – Joint Surveillance Target Attack Radar System on the E-8 JSTARS aircraft
 JA – Judge Advocate
 JA/ATT – Joint Airborne/ Air Transportability Training
 JAOC – Joint Air and Space Operations Center
 JATO – Jet-Assisted Take-Off
 JDAM – Joint Direct Attack Munition
 JEEP – Just Enough Education To Pass
 JEEP – Just Entering Electronic Principals
 JEEP – Just Educated Enough to Post (Security Forces)
 JFACC – Joint Forces Air Component Commander
 JEIM – Jet Engine Intermediate Maintenance
 JOAP – Joint Oil Analysis Program
 JOPES – Joint Operation Planning and Execution System
 JPATS – Joint Primary Air Training System
 JPME – Joint Professional Military Education
 JPPT – Joint Primary Pilot Training
 JSF – Joint Strike Fighter
 JSOW – Joint Standoff Weapon
 JSUPT – Joint Specialized Undergraduate Pilot Training
 JWICS – Joint Worldwide Intelligence Communications System

K

 KIA - Killed In Action

 KISS – Keep It Simple, Stupid

L

 LAPES – Low Altitude Parachute Extraction System
 LATN – Low Altitude Tactical Navigation
 Lawn Dart – Nickname for F-16 Fighting Falcon or any other fast, pointy-nosed, single-engine fighter aircraft
 LCAP – Logistics Compliance Assessment Program
 LEAP – Language Enabled Airman Program
 LFE – Large Formation Exercise
 LG – Logistics Group
 LGB – Laser-Guided Bomb
 LIFT – Lead In Fighter Training
 LIMFAC – Limiting Factor
 Linda Lovelace (Reference to the C-5 Galaxy aircraft, because it kneels and takes it from both ends)
 LMR – Land Mobile Radio
 LOA – Letter of Admonishment
 LOA – Letter of Appreciation
 LOAC – Law of Armed Conflict
 LOC – Letter of Counseling
 LOGI – Logistics NCOIC (Squadron, Group, Wing)
 LOR – Letter of Reprimand
 LOWAT – Low Altitude Training
LRE - Large-Scale Readiness Exercise
 LRS – Logistics Readiness Squadron
 LT – Familiar term for a Lieutenant, Second or First; usually used as a form of address by those under his/her command
 Lt Col – Lieutenant Colonel; officer pay grade O-5
 Lt Gen – Lieutenant General; officer pay grade O-9
 LWOP – Leave Without Pay

M

 MAC – Military Airlift Command (disestablished MAJCOM)
 MAF – Missile Alert Facility
 Maj – Major; officer pay grade O-4
 Maj Gen – Major General; officer pay grade O-8
 MAJCOM – Major Command
 MANPADS – Man-Portable Air Defense System
 MARE – Major Accident Response Exercise
 MASINT – Measurement and Signature Intelligence
 MATS – Military Air Transport Service (disestablished command, superseded by MAC and then AMC
 MDG – Medical Group
 MDS – Mission Design Series of aircraft; analogous to T/M/S for Type/Model/Series in USN & USMC (Naval Aviation)  
 MEO – Military Equal Opportunity
 MEPS – Military Entrance Processing Station
 METL – Mission Essential Task Listing
 MFLC – Military and Family Life Counselor
 MFH – Military Family Housing
 MFT – Mobile Fire Team
 MICAP – Mission Incapable
 MICT – Management Internal Control Toolset
 MIF – Maneuver Item File
 MILDEC – Military Deception
 Militime – military time
 MILSTRIP – Military Standard Requisitioning and Issue Procedure
 MLR – Management Level Review
 MOAB – Massive Ordnance Air Blast Bomb/Mother Of All Bombs
 MOOTW – Military Operations Other than War
 MOS – Maintenance Operations Squadron
 Mosquito Wings – Nickname for the Airman rank insignia
 MPF – Military Personnel Flight
 MRE – Meal Ready to Eat
 MS – Missile Squadron
 MSA - Munitions Storage Area
 MSG – Mission Support Group
 MSME – Medical Standard Management Element
 MSgt – Master Sergeant; enlisted pay grade E-7
 MSS – Mission Support Squadron
 MTI – Military Training Instructor
 MTL – Military Training Leader

 Mud Hen – Nickname for the F-15E Strike Eagle
 MUNS - Munitions, or Munitions Squadron/Flight
 MW – Missile Wing
 MWR – Morale, Welfare and Recreation
 MWS – Major Weapons System
 MX – Maintenance
 MXG – Maintenance Group
 MXS – Maintenance Squadron

N

 NAF – Numbered Air Force
 Nav – Navigator, now known since 2009 as a Combat Systems Officer 
 NCC – Network Control Center
 NCO – Non-commissioned Officer
 NCOA – Non-commissioned Officer Academy
 NCOIC – Non-Commissioned Officer in Charge
 NCW – Network-Centric Warfare
 NDI – Nondestructive Inspection
 NEADS – Northeast Air Defense Sector
 NGB – National Guard Bureau
 NIPR – Non-secure Internet Protocol (IP) Router Network
 NKAWTG – Nobody Kicks Ass Without Tanker Gas
 NMC – Non Mission Capable
 NMSA – Non-Nuclear Munitions Storage Area
 NMUSAF – National Museum of the United States Air Force 
 Nonner – "Non-sortie generating." Derogatory term used by aircraft maintenance personnel when referring to enlisted and officers who are not directly involved in aircraft maintenance or manning aircraft
 Non-rated Officer – USAF commissioned officer not holding an aeronautical rating
 NOSC – Network Operations and Security Center
 NOTAM – Notice To Airmen
 NSI – Nuclear Surety Inspection
 NVG – Night Vision Goggles
 NUB – New Useless Bitch (reference for new person on station; contraction from newbie (which was originally new boy), and then backronymed)

O

 OA – Occupational Analysis
 OA – Outstanding Airman
 OAPT – Officer Awaiting Pilot Training.
 OAPTer – An officer in OAPT status. While other 2nd Lt's begin their flight training, non-flying technical training and/or initial leadership roles, OAPTers complete menial tasks in support of the mission while they wait for their assigned training date (this is known as "casual status"). It is important for all operational bases, as OAPTers are most often supplemental to the assigned commissioned officer workforce.
 OAR – Occupational Analysis Report
 OAY – Outstanding Airman of the Year
 OAYA – Outstanding Airman of the Year Award
 OCO – Offensive Cyber Operations
 OCONUS – Outside the Continental United States
 OCP – Operational Camouflage Pattern
 OCR – Office of Collateral Responsibility
 OFO – Out Fucking Off
 OG – Operations Group
 OIC – Officer in Command 
 OL – Operating Location
 OODA – Observe Orient Decide Act
 OPCON – Operational Control
 OPR – Office of Primary Responsibility
 OPR – Officer Performance Report
 OPSEC – Operations Security
 OPTN – Operationalizing and Professionalizing the Network
 ORI – Operational Readiness Inspection
 ORM – Operation Risk Management
 OSI – Office of Special Investigation
 OSR – Occupational Survey Report
 OSS – Operations Support Squadron
 OT&E – Operational Test and Evaluation
 OTS – Officer Training School

P

 PA – Public Affairs
 PACAF – Pacific Air Forces
 PAFSC – Primary Air Force Specialty Code
 PAR – Post Attack Reconnaissance, Precision Approach Radar
 PAS – Political Affairs Strategist
 PAX – Air passengers
 PCS – Permanent Change of Station
 PDF - Personnel Deployment Function
 PDS – Permanent Duty Station
 PERSCO – Personnel Support for Contingency Operations
 Perpes – Humorous nickname for PRP, takeoff on herpes
 PFE – Promotion Fitness Examination
 PFM – Pure Fucking Magic; Term to refer to a technical problem that somehow resolved itself
 PFT – Physical Fitness Test
 PICNIC – Problem In Chair, Not In Computer; Used by help desk personnel to indicate user ignorance
 PING – Person In Need of Graduation
 PITT – Person In need of Technical Training
 PJ – Pararescueman
 PMC – Partially Mission Capable
 PME – Professional Military Education
 PMEL – Precision Measurement Equipment Laboratory
 Pocket Rocket – Term for the missile badge on the uniforms of current and former ICBM and cruise missile launch operations and missile maintenance personnel
 POL – Petroleum, Oils, & Lubricants, the traditional name for the Fuels Management Flight
 Pop Tart – Airman whose technical career schools are 6 weeks or less
 posn – position
 Prime Beef – Prime Base Engineer Emergency Force
 PRD – Pilot Reported Discrepancy
 PRF – Promotion Recommendation Form
 PRP – Personnel Reliability Program
 PSDM – Personnel Services Delivery Memorandum
 PSYOP – Psychological Operations
 PTL – Physical Training Leader

Q

 QA - Quality Assurance
 QAF – Quality Air Force
 Queep – A task or duty that is completely useless and ultimately unrelated to your primary job. It is often assigned by superiors not of your career field as they assume that you have time to constantly work these tasks. Example: "I have a lot of queep to do before I go home." "I need to finish all of this queep before I can go fly."

R

 RA – Resource Advisor
 RAF – Royal Air Force
 Rainbow Flight – Fresh trainees at BMT who have not yet received uniforms (clothing colors represent the rainbow)
 RAM – Random Antiterrorism Measure
 RAPCON – Radar Approach Control
 RAS – Regional Affairs Strategist
 Rated Officer – USAF commissioned officer holding an aeronautical rating as a Pilot (to include Astronaut), Combat Systems Officer (to include Astronaut), Navigator (to include Astronaut), Air Battle Manager, Observer (Astronaut) or Flight Surgeon   
 RED HORSE – Rapid Engineer Deployable Heavy Operational Repair Squadron Engineers
 RET, Ret, (Ret) – Designations for retired military personnel, typically following the service designation in a title, e.g., Col USAF (Ret)
 RF – Radio frequency
 RFF – Request [F]or Forces (initiated by Army)
 RHIP – "Rank Has Its Privileges"
 RIF – Reduction In Force
 RIP – Report on Individual Personnel
 RNLTD – Report No Later Than Date
 ROAD – Retired On Active Duty
 RON – Remain overnight
 ROTC – Reserve Officers' Training Corps
 RPA – Remotely Piloted Aircraft
 RQG – Rescue Group
 RQS – Rescue Squadron (formerly ARS)
 RQW – Rescue Wing
 RTB – Return To Base
 RTIC – Real Time In the Cockpit
 RS – Reconnaissance Squadron
 RW – Reconnaissance Wing

S
 SAASS – School of Advanced Air and Space Studies
 SABC – Self Aid Buddy Care
 SAC – Strategic Air Command (disestablished MAJCOM)
 SAF/SECAF – Secretary of the Air Force
 SAM – Surface to Air Missile
 SAMSO – Space and Missile Systems Organization
 SAPR – Sexual Assault Prevention and Response
 SARC – Sexual Assault Response Coordinator
 SATCOM – Satellite Communications
 SAV – Staff Assistance Visit
 SBIRS – Space-Based Infrared System
 SCOD – Static Close Out Date
 SDF – Standard Deployment Folder
 SEAD – Suppression of Enemy Air Defenses (pronounced "seed")
 SEADS – Southeast Air Defense Sector
 SEI – Special Experience Identifier
 Secret Squirrel stuff – Material classified above secret or special compartmentalized information
 Senior – Informal shortening for Senior Master Sergeant
 SEPCOR – Separate Correspondence
 SERE – Survival, Evasion, Resistance and Escape
 SF – Security Forces
 SF – Space Force
 SF – Special Forces
 SFS – Security Forces Squadron
 Sgt – Sergeant; former enlisted pay grade E-4 from 1976 to 1991, now designated as SrA 
 Shirt – A unit first sergeant
 Short – Close to a PCS date or retirement
 Sierra Hotel (SH) – Shit Hot
 SIGINT – Signals Intelligence
 SIPR – Secret Internet Protocol
 SKT – Specialty Knowledge Test
 Slick Sleeve – Nickname for an Airman Basic (owing to the absence of rank insignia on an individual's sleeve)
 SLUF – Short Little Ugly Fucker (derogatory nickname for the LTV A-7 Corsair II)
 SME – Subject Matter Expert
 SMSgt – Senior Master Sergeant, enlisted pay grade E-8
 SNAFU – Situation Normal All Fucked Up
 SNCO – Senior Non-commissioned Officer; enlisted pay grades E-7, E-8 and E-9
 SNCOA – Senior Non-commissioned Officer Academy
 Snacko – A highly underestimated, mission critical position held most often by newly reported Lieutenants in a flying squadron. Doing well at the Snacko position will prompt one for a laudable career. Failing at such a job will often entail severe ridicule and, if necessary, replacement and retraining by the flying squadron.
 Snuffy – Generic term given to any Airmen of lower rank. "And here came Airman Snuffy late to the party as usual."
 SOP – Standard Operating Procedure
 SOPS – Space Operations Squadron
 SOS – Squadron Officer School
 SOS – Special Operations Squadron
 SOW – Special Operations Wing
 SOWT – Special Operations Weather Technician
 Spark Chaser – Nickname for aircraft maintenance personnel dealing with electronic, non-mechanical systems
 Spirit Mission – A good-natured act, commonly in the form of a prank, banner, or...re-acquisition...of a person/thing, to show pride for a group of individuals. Usually harmless.
 Sq – Squadron
 SrA – Senior Airman; enlisted pay grade E-4
 SRC – Solid Rock Cafe (new as of 2011, located at Sheppard AFB, TX – unofficial, used by officers as well as students)
 SRT – Security Response Team
 SSgt – Staff Sergeant; enlisted pay grade E-5
 SST – Supervisor Safety Training
 Staff – Informal shortening for Staff Sergeant
 STEP – Stripe Through Exceptional Performance
 Stick Actuator – Pilot
 Stink Bug – Nickname for the F-117 Nighthawk
 Strike Eagle – Nickname for the F-15E Strike Eagle
 STS – Special Tactics Squadron
 sUAS – Small Unmanned Aircraft System
 SURF – Single Uniform Request Format
 SVS – Services Squadron
 SW – Space Wing
 SWA – Southwest Asia
 SWAG – Scientific Wild-Ass Guess
 SWO – Staff Weather Officer

T

 T&A – Test and Acceptance
 TAC – Tactical Air Command (disestablished MAJCOM)
 TAC-P – Tactical Air Control Party
 TACAN – Tactical Air Navigation
 TACON – Tactical Control
 TAFCSD – Total Active Federal Commission Service Date
 TAFMSD – Total Active Federal Military Service Date
 TAG (AG) – The Adjutant General
 Tail-End Charlie – Person bringing up the rear of a formation or a tail gunner
 TAP – Transition Assistance Program
 TBA – Training Business Area
 TCNO – Time Compliance Network Order
 TCTO – Time Compliance Technical Order
 TDY – Temporary Duty; analogous to Temporary Additional Duty (TAD / TEMADD) in USN, USMC and USCG 
 Tech – Informal shortening of Technical Sergeant
 TFCSD – Total Federal Commissioned Service to Date
 TFI – Total Force Integration
 TGP – Targeting Pod
 TIG – The Inspector General
 TLAR – That Looks About Right
 TLF – Temporary Living Facility
 TMO – Traffic Management Office
 TO – Technical Order
 TOT – Time Over Target
 Tracking – Reference to offensive avionics on combat aircraft. Following and understanding the subject at hand. (IE: "I need this done yesterday, Airman. Are you tracking?")
 TRF – Tactical Response Force
 TRG – Training Group
 TRS – Training Squadron
 TRW – Training Wing
 TSgt – Technical Sergeant; enlisted pay grade E-6
 TST – Time-Sensitive Target
 TTP – Tactics, Techniques, and Procedures
 TU – Tango Uniform, slang for 'tits up'.

U

 UAS – unmanned aircraft system
 UAV – unmanned aerial vehicle
 UCI – unit compliance inspection
UCR – unsatisfactory condition report
 UCSOT – Undergraduate Combat Systems Officer Training
 UHT – Undergraduate Helicopter Pilot Training
 UIF – unfavorable information file
 ULN – unit line number
 UMD – unit manpower document
 UNT – Undergraduate Navigator Training (superseded by UCSOT) 
 UNWT – Undergraduate Network Warfare Training
 UPT – Undergraduate Pilot Training (superseded by ENJJPT, JSUPT and UHT)
 USAF – United States Air Force
 USAFA – United States Air Force Academy
 USAFE – United States Air Forces in Europe
 USAFEC – United States Air Force Expeditionary Center
 USAFR – United States Air Force Reserve
 USAFWC – United States Air Force Warfare Center

V

 VAQ – visiting airman quarters
 VFR – visual flight rules
 Viper – nickname for the F-16 Fighting Falcon
 VML – vulnerable to move list
 vMPF – virtual military personnel flight
 VOQ – visiting officer quarters
 VOR – VHF omnidirectional range
 V/R – virtual regards / very respectfully (closing salutation)
 vRED – virtual record of emergency data
 VSP – voluntary separation pay

W

 Warthog – Fairchild Republic A-10 Thunderbolt II
 WADS – Western Air Defense Sector
 WAF – Women in the Air Force
 WAG – Wild Ass Guess
 WAPS – Weighted Airman Promotion System
 WASP – Women Airforce Service Pilots
 WC – wing chaplain
 WG – wing
 WIC – weapons instructor course
 WIT – wing inspection team
 Winchester – out of ammo
 WOWWAJAA – with out weapons we are just another airline
 WRM – war reserve material
 WRT – with regard to / with reference to
 WSA – weapons storage area
 WSO – weapon systems officer
 WX – weather

X

 X-plane – experimental aircraft
 XB3 – disposable item

Y

 Y-plane – prototype aircraft

Z

 Zero – officer
 Zoo – nickname for the Air Force Academy
 Zoomie – nickname for an Air Force Academy graduate or cadet

See also
List of acronyms
List of U.S. government and military acronyms
List of U.S. Marine Corps acronyms and expressions
List of U.S. Navy acronyms

References

External links

Air Force Acronyms and Abbreviations
Air Force Related Acronyms
Military acronyms

Air Force acronyms and expressions
United States military traditions
Acronyms
United states Air Force